The Siberian zokor (Myospalax myospalax) is a species of rodent in the family Spalacidae. It is found in Kazakhstan and Russia.

References

Myospalax
Mammals described in 1773
Taxonomy articles created by Polbot
Mammals of Siberia
Fauna of Kazakhstan
Rodents of Asia